Sloma is a surname. It is derived from Shlomo, the Hebrew name of Solomon.

Sloma is a surname. It is derived from the Polish Slavonic word słoma.
"The word słoma in the sense ‘dry cereal stalks’, recorded in Polish since the 15th c., is a Slavic
form (cf. Czech sláma, Russian solóma, Serbo-Croatian slama etc.) and is
related to the German Halm ‘stalk’, Lat. culmus ‘stalk, blade of grass’, Greek
kalamos, Old Indic calakas ‘stalk’."
https://cejsh.icm.edu.pl/cejsh/element/bwmeta1.element.ojs-doi-10_17951_et_2017_29_111/c/5029-5508.pdf
https://en.wiktionary.org/wiki/sloma

Notable people with the surname include:

 Michał Słoma (born 1982), Polish rower
 Sam Sloma (born 1982), English football player
 Ulrich Sloma (born 1942), German field hockey player

References